Point Blank Records is a record label subsidiary of Virgin Records.

Point Blank Records was founded in 1988 by John Wooler.  Wooler served as Deputy Head of A&R at Virgin Records UK from 1984 to 1994 and Senior Vice President of Virgin Records US from 1994 to 2002. He had a passion for blues, Americana and soul.  His manager, Simon Draper, granted him a small budget to create the label. The first act signed to the record label was Larry McCray followed by Albert Collins and The Kinsey Report. Artists such as John Lee Hooker, Solomon Burke, Pops Staples, John Hammond, Walter "Wolfman" Washington, Van Morrison, and Johnny Winter were later signed to the label as well. Wooler signed all the musicians on the label and produced many of them.

See also
 List of record labels

References

External links
John Wooler video interview

British record labels
1988 establishments in the United Kingdom
Record labels established in 1988
Virgin Records